Knut Værnes (born 1 April 1954) is a Norwegian jazz musician (guitar), composer and band leader, known from several recordings in the jazz rock genre. He grew up at Bøler in Oslo, where he became an accomplished guitarist.

Career
Værnes was born in Trondheim, Norway. He is a graduate from the University of Oslo and has attended master classes at  the Manhattan School of Music, and played within pop and rock bands like «Salt & Pepper», «Shimmy», and the fusion band «Vanessa» with the record release City Lips (1975). Then musical studies in Oslo and Bergen brought him on to the Norwegian jazz scene with albums like Anatomy of the guitar  (1979), in collaboration with his guitar teacher Jon Eberson, within Nils Petter Molvær's funk band «Punktum» and Håkon Graf's «Graffiti». In the 1980s, he studied with John Scofield at the Manhattan School of Music.

Værnes led his own Trio and Quartet with co-musicians Morten Halle (saxophone), Edvard Askeland (bass) and Frank Jakobsen (drums). The Quartet continued as the band Cutting Edge resulting in four album releases.
In duo with Terje Gewelt bass was released Admission for guitars and basses (1992) with their own compositions. KVT (with Kim Ofstad drums and Frode Berg bass) released Jacques Tati (1995), and with Danny Gottlieb, drummer of Pat Metheny Group as substitute for Ofstad, «8:97» (1997) as well as Super Duper (1999).
Knut Værnes Band (Morten Halle, Nils Petter Molvær, Rune Arnesen og Gewelt) released Roneo (1993).
The guitar quartet composed of Knut Reiersrud, Bjørn Klakegg and Frode Alnæs released «4G» (2000).

Værnes has participated on numerous recordings in different genres, including Geirr Lystrup's Songen om kjærleika (1980), Etterlatte sanger (1986)together with Sidsel Endresen and Jonas Fjeld, Jan Eggum's (E.G.G.U.M. (1995) and Stilig (1986), and Gym (1997) with Di Derre.
In 2001 he was awarded Gammleng-prisen in the category jazz. His latest release is A night in the cassis (2004), where his music is arranged for the Vertavo String Quartet. Værnes trio played at the Trondheim Jazz Festival 2006, and recently he has cooperated with the Swedish double bassist Lars Danielsson.

Værnes is co-owner of the music companies Curling Legs (1986- ) and Musikkoperatørene, members of FONO (the association for Norwegian independent record labels), sat as chairman of the Association of Norwegian Jazz Musicians for a period, and was chairman of the Committee for Spellemannprisen. He also teaches at the Nordic Institute for Stage and Studio.

Honors 
Gammleng-prisen 2001 in the category jazz

Discography

Solo albums 
Within Knut Værnes Band
1993: Roneo (Curling Legs)
2013: Tributes (Curling Legs)

Within Knut Værnes Trio 
Including Kim Ofstad (drums) and Frode Berg (bass)
1995: Jacques Tati (Curling Legs)
Including Danny Gottlieb (drums) and Frode Berg (bass)
1997: «8:97» (Curling Legs)
1999: Super Duper (Curling Legs)

Collaborative works 
Within Vanessa
1975: City lips

With Jon Eberson
1979: Anatomy of the guitar

Within Cutting Edge
1982: Cutting Edge
1983: Our man in paradise
1986: Duesenberg

Duo with Terje Gewelt
1992: Admission For Guitars And Basses (Curling Legs)

With other projects
2000: 4G, with Frode Alnæs, Knut Reiersrud and Bjørn Klakegg
1980: Songen om kjærleika, with Geirr Lystrup
1986: Etterlatte sanger, with Sidsel Endresen and Jonas Fjeld
1986: Stilig (Single), with Jan Eggum
1985: E.G.G.U.M., with Jan Eggum
1997: Gym, with Di Derre
2004: A night in Cassis (Curling Legs), with the Vertavo String Quartet

References

External links
Knut Værnes Biography - Store Norske Leksikon
Knut Værnes official website

Living people
1954 births
Musicians from Trondheim
Norwegian jazz guitarists
Jazz-pop guitarists
Norwegian jazz composers
Curling Legs artists
Cutting Edge (band) members